Choedrak Monastery is a Buddhist monastery in Bhutan, located at an altitude of 3,800 metres, not far from Tharpaling Monastery in Bumthang District. Guru Rinpoche is said to have meditated at this spot.

In 1234, Lorepa, a Drukpa Kagyupa lama from Tibet build a temple here and resided in it. However, after he returned to Tibet, the temple was said to have been besieged by evil spirits. According to his biography, it was renovated by Damcho Pekar (later 4th Je Khenpo) after his return from Nepal. It was repaired by Ngawang Trinley, an eminent monk from Siula Monastery in the Punakha region.

References

Buddhist monasteries in Bhutan
Tibetan Buddhist monasteries
1234 establishments in Asia
Tibetan Buddhism in Bhutan